Louth and Horncastle is a constituency in Lincolnshire represented in the House of Commons of the UK Parliament by Victoria Atkins, a Conservative.

Boundaries 

1997–2010: The District of East Lindsey wards of Alford, Chapel St Leonards, Coningsby, Donington on Bain, Fotherby, Grimoldby, Halton Holegate, Hogsthorpe, Holton le Clay, Horncastle, Hundleby, Legbourne, Mablethorpe, Mareham le Fen, Marshchapel, New Leake, North Holme, North Somercotes, North Thoresby, Partney, Priory, Roughton, St James', St Margaret's, St Mary's, St Michael's, Spilsby, Sutton and Trusthorpe, Tattershall, Tetford, Tetney, Theddlethorpe St Helen, Trinity, Willoughby with Sloothby, Withern with Stain, and Woodhall Spa.

2010–present: The District of East Lindsey wards of Alford, Binbrook, Chapel St Leonards, Coningsby and Tattershall, Grimoldby, Halton Holegate, Holton le Clay, Horncastle, Hundleby, Legbourne, Ludford, Mablethorpe Central, Mablethorpe East, Mablethorpe North, Mareham le Fen, Marshchapel, North Holme, North Somercotes, North Thoresby, Priory, Roughton, St James', St Margaret's, St Mary's, St Michael's, Skidbrooke with Saltfleet Haven, Spilsby, Sutton on Sea North, Sutton on Sea South, Tetford, Tetney, Trinity, Trusthorpe and Mablethorpe South, Willoughby with Sloothby, Withern with Stain, and Woodhall Spa.

History of boundaries
From 1885 to 1983, Louth and Horncastle both existed as separate constituencies. Then in 1983, Horncastle was moved into the new seat of Gainsborough and Horncastle, while Louth was moved into the newly formed East Lindsey constituency. These boundaries remained the same until 1997, when the current Louth and Horncastle constituency was formed.

Constituency profile 
This large stretch of Lincolnshire coastline includes the seaside resorts of Mablethorpe and Sutton-on-Sea, this immediate coastline has a minority of small output areas with severe deprivation following the decline of the tourism industry apart from holiday cottages, being further north than popular family resorts in Skegness. The seat's eponymous towns of Louth and Horncastle lie inland amid a rural area of the Lincolnshire Wolds where farming is an important sector, with most constituents on modest to mid-level income and low unemployment.

History
The seat was created in 1997.  Conservatives have been dominant in the area for decades, the closest result was in 1997, when a Labour Party candidate came the closest of any opponents to being elected.

Members of Parliament 
The MP for this seat is Victoria Atkins. She succeeded Peter Tapsell at the 2015 general election. He previously represented the predecessor seats of East Lindsey and Horncastle from 1966 to 1997, and before that represented Nottingham West from 1959 to 1964 before being defeated by Labour. Prior to standing down, he was the longest-serving Conservative MP, albeit with the break in service, and from 2001, he was the only MP of any party first elected in the 1950s. Following the retirement of Alan Williams, Tapsell became, on his re-election in 2010, Father of the House.  He was succeeded in the honorific position in 2015 by Sir Gerald Kaufman.

Before 1997, see East Lindsey

Elections

2010s

2000s

1990s

See also 
 Louth constituency (1885–1983)
 List of parliamentary constituencies in Lincolnshire

Notes

References

Parliamentary constituencies in Lincolnshire
Constituencies of the Parliament of the United Kingdom established in 1997